Brachydiplax denticauda is a species of dragonfly in the family Libellulidae
known commonly as the palemouth. It is native to Australia, Indonesia, Papua New Guinea, and the Solomon Islands.
It lives in habitat with still and slow-moving waters.

Males of this species are typical in colour for the genus, being bright powder blue on both the thorax and abdomen. The labrum is pale cream, thus giving the species its common name of palemouth. In northern Australia, it is found coastal and adjacent inland in an arc from the southern Queensland border to Broome, Western Australia.

Brief Description
This species is small in size with a wingspan of 40 to 60 millimeters. Brachydiplax denticauda usually has six antenodal crossveins in the fore-wing and five in the hind-wing whereas the very similar Brachydiplax duivenbodei has seven antenodal crossveins in the fore-wing and six in the hind-wing. Though brightly coloured, the males often go unnoticed by an observer once they land on a lily pad or similar place.

Gallery

References

Libellulidae
Odonata of Oceania
Odonata of Australia
Insects of New Guinea
Taxa named by Friedrich Moritz Brauer
Insects described in 1867